Gilad Haran (Hebrew: גלעד הרן; born January 16, 1960) is an Israeli biophysicist and physical chemist, a full professor at the Faculty of Chemistry in the Weizmann Institute of Science, and its former dean. An expert in molecular machines. Laureate of Weizmann Prize (2017) and Nakanishi Prize (2023).

Biography 
Haran was born and raised Gilad Herling in Holon,   the son of Meir and Drora and a grandson of the second mayor of Holon Pinchas Eilon.

He did his graduate studies in medical science at the medical school of the Hebrew University of Jerusalem and completed the degree summa cum laude (1986).

He then started working as a research assistant to Prof. Hezi Barenholz at the Hebrew University. At this time, he took part in the development of the first nanomedicine ever, Doxyl.

In 1988 Haran started his doctoral studies at the Weizmann Institute of Science under the supervision of Ephraim Katzir (a former President of Israel) and Elisha Haas. His dissertation (1993) discussed the dynamics of the conformation of polypeptides and proteins.

During the next years, he was a post-doctoral fellow in the department of Chemistry of University of Pennsylvania with Robin M. Hochstrasser. He was working on ultrafast spectroscopy of reaction dynamics in proteins and fluids.

Upon his coming back to Israel in 1998, he joined as a senior lecturer at the department of chemical physics at the Weizmann Institute. In 2005 he was appointed an associate professor and, in 2011, a full professor. In 2007–2011 he served as the head of the board of Chemistry at the Feinberg Graduate School.

In 2012, Haran was appointed the 11th dean of the Faculty of Chemistry and served six years in this post.

He is married to Michal Haran, a hematologist at the Kaplan medical center and a senior lecturer at the medical school of the Hebrew University.

Research 
Gilad Haran‘s laboratory focuses on the spectroscopy and dynamics of single molecules and particles. His lab develops new spectroscopic methodology and applies it in two major fields of research. They have made internationally-recognized contributions in the major field of protein folding and dynamics, as well as the organization of proteins with respect to cellular membrane topography.

Molecular Machines and Protein Folding   
Haran's lab has been a pioneer in studies of folding on the single-molecule level, based on their original methods for immobilizing biomolecules and for the analysis of multiple single-molecule trajectories. The lab has also combined polymer theory with single-molecule fluorescence to understand the dimensions of unfolded proteins under native conditions.

This contribution formed the basis for a large body of works by multiple labs. More recently, they have been developing, in a European Research Council-funded project, novel applications of single-molecule fluorescence to study the functional dynamics of proteins.

Their introduction of photon-by-photon single-molecule FRET methodology and analysis exposed exciting structural dynamics in proteins. In particular, they made the surprising observation that the domain closure of an enzyme is two orders of magnitude faster than its chemical reaction, suggesting a new mechanism for coupling of conformational dynamics and function. And in a series of studies on a large protein machine involved in disaggregation, they revealed how fast motions of the machine contribute to its activity. 

Thus, for example, the middle domain, which serves as the allosteric switch of the machine, toggles between its two states on the microsecond time scale. And the motion of pore loops, responsible for pulling substrate proteins through the machine, is faster than ATP hydrolysis, pointing to a Brownian ratchet mechanism for machine operation. The lab‘s work on a series of allosteric proteins indicates that large-scale microsecond motions are more abundant than previously thought, and have novel roles in protein function.

Supplemental Research Fields
Haran's lab also investigates cell membrane dynamics, super-resolution microscopy of T-cells, and coupling of plasmonic structures with molecules and other quantum emitters.  

Haran is a member of the Israeli Public Emergency Council for the COVID-19 Crisis (PECC).

Awards 
 1999: Incumbent of the Benjamin H. Swig and Jack D. Weiler Career Development Chair
 2010: Incumbent of the Hilda Pomeraniec Memorial Professorial Chair 
 2017: European Research Council Advanced Grant (Smallostery)
 2017: Weizmann Prize for the Exact Sciences, awarded by the Tel-Aviv municipality
 2019: Fellow of the Biophysical Society
 2019: ACS Physical Chemistry Division Award for Experimental Physical Chemistry
 2021: Fellow of the Royal Society of Chemistry
 2022: Israel Science Foundation Breakthrough Grant
 2023: American Chemical Society Nakanishi Prize

Selected papers  
<div style="direction: ltr;">
 G Haran, R Cohen, LK Bar, Y Barenholz. Transmembrane ammonium sulfate gradients in liposomes produce efficient and stable entrapment of amphipathic weak bases. Biochimica et Biophysica Acta (BBA)-Biomembranes 1151 (2), 201-215.
 G Schreiber, G Haran, HX Zhou. Fundamental aspects of protein− protein association kinetics. Chemical reviews 109 (3), 839-860.
 E Rhoades, E Gussakovsky, G Haran. Watching proteins fold one molecule at a time. Proceedings of the National Academy of Sciences 100 (6), 3197-3202.
 K Santhosh, O Bitton, L Chuntonov, G Haran. Vacuum Rabi splitting in a plasmonic cavity at the single quantum emitter limit. Nature communications 7 (1), 1-5.
 E Boukobza, A Sonnenfeld, G Haran. Immobilization in surface-tethered lipid vesicles as a new tool for single biomolecule spectroscopy. The Journal of Physical Chemistry B 105 (48), 12165-12170.
 A Weiss, G Haran. Time-dependent single-molecule Raman scattering as a probe of surface dynamics. The Journal of Physical Chemistry B 105 (49), 12348-12354.
 E Sherman, G Haran. Coil–globule transition in the denatured state of a small protein. Proceedings of the National Academy of Sciences 103 (31), 11539-11543.
 JL England, G Haran. Role of solvation effects in protein denaturation: from thermodynamics to single molecules and back. Annual review of physical chemistry 62, 257-277.
 T Shegai, Z Li, T Dadosh, Z Zhang, H Xu, G Haran. Managing light polarization via plasmon–molecule interactions within an asymmetric metal nanoparticle trimer. Proceedings of the National Academy of Sciences 105 (43), 16448-16453.
 H Mazal, M Iljina, I Riven, G Haran. Ultrafast pore-loop dynamics in a AAA+ machine point to a Brownian-ratchet mechanism for protein translocation. Science advances, 7(36), eabg4674.
 HY Aviram, M Pirchi, H Mazal, Y Barak, I Riven, G Haran. Direct observation of ultrafast large-scale dynamics of an enzyme under turnover conditions. PNAS 115(13) 3243-3248.

Links 
  of Gilad Haran's lab
 Gilad Haran, Google Scholar 
 Gilad Haran, ResearchGate

References 

Living people
Israeli physical chemists
Israeli biophysicists
Academic staff of Weizmann Institute of Science
1960 births
The Hebrew University-Hadassah Medical School alumni
Weizmann Institute of Science alumni